The following lists events that happened in 2012 in North Korea.

Incumbents
Premier: Choe Yong-rim 
Supreme Leader: Kim Jong-un

References

Further reading
 

 
North Korea
Years of the 21st century in North Korea
2010s in North Korea
North Korea